Kotoku Royals F.C. (previously known as Kotoku Royals Academy) is a professional football team from Akim Oda, Eastern Region in Ghana, currently playing in Ghana Division One. Founded in 2003 and given permission to play professional matches in 2005, the club made successive promotions through the Ghana League system to their current place in Division One.

In March, 2017 Englishman Matt Ward was appointed Head Coach for two years. but the coach left after just three months.

References

Eastern Region (Ghana)
Football clubs in Ghana
Association football clubs established in 2003
2003 establishments in Ghana